Jared David Warner (born 14 November 1996) is an English cricketer who plays for Gloucestershire County Cricket Club. He made his List A debut on 6 May 2019, for Yorkshire in the 2019 Royal London One-Day Cup. He made his first-class debut on 27 May 2019, for Sussex in the 2019 County Championship. He made his Twenty20 debut on 29 May 2022, for Gloucestershire against the Sri Lanka Cricket Development XI during their tour of England.

References

External links
 

1996 births
Living people
English cricketers
Sussex cricketers
Yorkshire cricketers
Gloucestershire cricketers
Cricketers from Wakefield
English cricketers of the 21st century